Xantes Mariales (born about 1580; died at Venice in April 1660) was an Italian Dominican theologian.

Life

He was of a noble Venetian family. At an early age he entered the Dominican convent of Sts. John and Paul. Remarkable for his versatility and prodigious memory, he was sent to Spain, where he completed his studies.

He first taught at Venice, then at Padua where he three times exercised the office of regent. He was twice exiled by the Venetian senate, for showing excessive support for the Papacy.  At Milan, Ferrara, and Bologna where he took refuge, he was highly esteemed.

From 1624 onwards he led a retired life at Venice, devoting his time  to prayer, reading, and study. He died at Venice from apoplexy.

Works

Among his works are:

"Controversiæ ad universam Summam theol. S. Th. Aq." (Venice, 1624); 
"Amplissimum artium scientiarumque omnium amphitheatrum" (Bologna, 1658).

References

Hugo von Hurter, Nomenclator, who summarizes "Scriptores O. P.", II (Paris, 1721), 600; 
"Elogium" in "Acta Capituli Generalis O. P." (Rome, 1670).

1580s births
Place of birth missing
1660 deaths
Italian Dominicans
17th-century Italian Roman Catholic theologians